The following lists events that happened during 1933 in the Union of Soviet Socialist Republics.

Incumbents
 General Secretary of the Communist Party of the Soviet Union – Joseph Stalin
 Chairman of the Central Executive Committee of the Congress of Soviets – Mikhail Kalinin
 Chairman of the Council of People's Commissars of the Soviet Union – Vyacheslav Molotov
 People's Commissar for military and naval affairs- Kliment Voroshilov
 People's Commissar for heavy industry- Sergo Ordzhonikidze
 People's Commissar for Ways of Communication- Andrey Andreyev
 First Secretary of Moscow urban  committee of AUCP(b) - Lazar Kaganovich

Events
 2 August - White Sea–Baltic Canal opened.
 5 September - Tupolev ANT-7 crash near Podolsk, which led to a complete reorganization of air traffic in the Soviet Union.

Undated
 Second Five Year Plan Begins
 The Holodomor famine takes place in Ukraine.
 Joseph Stalin added Article 121 to the entire Soviet Union criminal code, which made male homosexuality a crime punishable by up to five years in prison with hard labor. The law remained intact until after the dissolution of the Soviet Union and was repealed in 1993.

Ongoing 
 Soviet famine of 1932–1933

Births
 6 January – Oleg Makarov, cosmonaut
 15 April - Boris Strugatsky, writer
 27 April - Leonid Roshal, pediatrician
 28 April – Dmitry Zimin, radio scientist and businessman (died 2021)
 12 May - Andrei Voznesensky, poet
 20 May – Zoya Klyuchko, entomologist
 19 June – Viktor Patsayev, cosmonaut
 9 July - Elem Klimov, filmmaker
 10 September – Yevgeny Khrunov, cosmonaut
 13 October - Mark Zakharov, filmmaker

Deaths
 1 March – Uładzimir Zylka, poet
 7 July – Mykola Skrypnyk, Ukrainian communist leader
 20 August - Vasily Boldyrev, WWI and Russian Civil War commander
 8 October - Leonid Vesnin, architect

See also
 1933 in fine arts of the Soviet Union
 List of Soviet films of 1933
 Five-year plans of the Soviet Union

References

 
1930s in the Soviet Union
Soviet Union
Soviet Union
Soviet Union